Bloemfontein CBD is the main Business District of the city of Bloemfontein in South Africa.

References

Suburbs of Bloemfontein